Redouan El Hankouri (born 3 February 2001) is a Moroccan professional footballer who plays as a midfielder for SteDoCo.

Club career
El Hankouri made his professional debut for Excelsior in a 2–0 Eredivisie win over NAC Breda on 25 August 2018.

International career
Born in the Netherlands, El Hankouri is of Moroccan descent. He debuted for the Morocco U20s in a 1–0 friendly win over the DR Congo U20s in October 2018.

Personal life
El Hankouri is the younger brother of the Moroccan footballer Mohamed El Hankouri.

References

External links

2001 births
Living people
Footballers from Rotterdam
Association football midfielders
Moroccan footballers
Morocco youth international footballers
Dutch footballers
Dutch sportspeople of Moroccan descent
Excelsior Rotterdam players
Eredivisie players